The Kay Yeager Coliseum is a 7,380-seat multi-purpose arena in Wichita Falls, Texas. It was completed in 2003. Kay Yeager served as Wichita Falls mayor from May 1996 to May 2000.

It was previously home to the Wichita Falls Wildcats junior ice hockey team from 2004 to 2017. It was also home to the Wichita Falls Nighthawks of the Indoor Football League and briefly the Wichita Falls Force of the USA Central Hockey League.

In 2019, the arena's added the Wichita Falls Flyers FC of the US Arena Pro Soccer League. In 2020, the arena gained another North American Hockey League expansion team called the Wichita Falls Warriors.

References

External links
Wichita Falls Multi-purpose Events Center (MPEC)

Indoor ice hockey venues in the United States
Sports venues in Texas
Buildings and structures in Wichita Falls, Texas
Wichita Falls Nighthawks
Indoor arenas in Texas
Sports venues completed in 2003
2003 establishments in Texas
Indoor soccer venues in the United States